Francis Davis Millet (November 3, 1848 – April 15, 1912) was an American academic classical painter, sculptor, and writer who died in the sinking of the RMS Titanic on April 15, 1912.

Early life
Francis Davis Millet was born in Mattapoisett, Massachusetts.  Most sources give his date of birth as November 3, 1846, but a diary which he kept during his military service stated that November 3, 1864 was his 16th birthday, indicating birth in 1848. At age fifteen, Millet entered the Massachusetts regiment, first as a drummer boy and then a surgical assistant (helping his father, a surgeon) in the American Civil War.

He repeatedly pointed to his experience working for his father as giving him an appreciation for the vivid blood red that he frequently used in his early paintings. He graduated from Harvard with a Master of Arts degree. He worked as a reporter and editor for the Boston Courier and then as a correspondent for the Advertiser at the Philadelphia Centennial Exposition.

Career

In 1876, Millet returned to Boston to paint murals at Trinity Church in Boston with John LaFarge.  He entered the Royal Academy of Fine Arts at Antwerp, Belgium.  He was the first student to win a silver medal in his first year; the following year he won a gold medal.  In the Russo‐Turkish war of 1877–78, he was engaged as a war correspondent by the New York Herald, the London Daily News, and the London Graphic.  He was decorated by Russia and Romania for his bravery under fire and his services to the wounded.

Millet became a member of the Society of American Artists in 1880, and in 1885 was elected as a member of the National Academy of Design, New York and as Vice-Chairman of the Fine Arts Committee. He was made a trustee of the Metropolitan Museum of Art, and sat on the advisory committee of the National Gallery of Art.  He was decorations director for the World's Columbian Exposition in Chicago in 1893, with claims he invented the first form of compressed air spraypainting to apply whitewash to the buildings, but the story may be apocryphal as contemporary journals note spraypainting had already been in use since the early 1880s. His career included work on a number of worlds' fairs, including Vienna, Chicago, Paris, and Tokyo, where he made contributions as a juror, administrator, mural painter/decorator, and adviser.

Millet was among the founders of the School of the Museum of Fine Arts, Boston, and was influential in the early days of the American Federation of Arts. He was instrumental in obtaining the appointment of Emil Otto Grundmann, an old acquaintance from his Antwerp days, as first head of the school. Millet was involved with the American Academy in Rome from its inception and served as secretary from 1904 to 1911. He was a founding member and vice chairman of the U.S. Commission of Fine Arts, serving from 1910 until his death in 1912.  He died aboard the Titanic while traveling to New York City on Academy business.

As well as an artist, Millet was a writer and journalist.  He translated Tolstoy and also wrote essays and short stories. Among his publications are Capillary Crime and Other Stories (1892), The Danube From the Black Forest to the Black Sea (1892) and Expedition to the Philippines (1899). He was elected a member of the American Academy of Arts and Letters and was an honorary member of the American Institute of Architects.

A noted sculptor and designer, Millet designed the 1907 Civil War Medal at the request of the U.S. Army and United States War Department and the 1908 Spanish Campaign Medal.  He executed the ceiling of the Call Room of the US Custom House at Baltimore, Maryland.

Personal life

Millet was close friends with Augustus Saint-Gaudens and Mark Twain, both of whom attended his 1879 wedding to Elizabeth ("Lily") Greely Merrill in Paris, France; Twain was Millet's best man.  The couple had four children: Kate, Edwin, Laurence, and John.

Millet was acquainted with the famed American portraitist John Singer Sargent, who often used Millet's daughter Kate as a model.  He was also close to the esteemed Huxley family.

Millet lived with Archibald Butt, who called him "my artist friend who lives with me", in a large mansion at 2000 G Street NW. They were known for throwing spartan but large parties that were attended by members of Congress, justices of the Supreme Court, and President Taft himself. There is some speculation that Butt and Millet were gay lovers. Historian Richard Davenport-Hines wrote in 2012:

Death 
On April 10, 1912, Millet boarded the RMS Titanic at Cherbourg, France, bound for New York City. He was traveling with long-time friend Archibald Butt. Millet was last seen helping women and children into lifeboats. His body was recovered after the sinking by the cable boat Mackay-Bennett and returned to East Bridgewater, Massachusetts, where he was buried in Central Cemetery.

Memorials

In 1913, the Butt-Millet Memorial Fountain was erected in Washington, D.C., in memory of Millet and his long-time friend Archibald W. Butt, with whom he shared a home.

A bronze bust in Harvard University's Widener Library also memorializes Millet.

In 2015, his murals were exhibited in Cleveland Ohio.

Gallery

See also

 The Devil in the White City
 Passengers of the RMS Titanic
 RMS Titanic
 World's Columbian Exposition

References

Further reading

External links

 .
 .
 
 
 .
 .
 

1848 births
1912 deaths
19th-century American painters
20th-century American painters
Union Army surgeons
American male painters
American muralists
Artists from Massachusetts
People from Mattapoisett, Massachusetts
American war correspondents
Harvard University alumni
Orientalist painters
People of Massachusetts in the American Civil War
Royal Academy of Fine Arts (Antwerp) alumni
Deaths on the RMS Titanic
Artists of the Boston Public Library
19th-century American male artists
20th-century American male artists